Terry Davies (born ) is an English former cricketer active from 1979 to 1986 who was born in St Albans and played for Glamorgan. He appeared in 100 first-class matches as a righthanded batsman and wicketkeeper. He scored 1,775 runs with a highest score of 75 and completed 166 catches with 27 stumpings.

Notes

1960 births
Living people
English cricketers
Glamorgan cricketers
Cricketers from St Albans